Azelia cilipes is a species of fly in the family Muscidae. It is found in the  Palearctic .

References

External links
 Ecology of Commanster 
 D'Assis Fonseca, E.C.M, 1968 Diptera Cyclorrhapha Calyptrata: Muscidae Handbooks for the Identification of British Insects pdf
 Seguy, E. (1923) Diptères Anthomyides. Paris: Éditions Faune de France Faune n° 6 393 p., 813 fig.Bibliotheque Virtuelle Numerique  pdf

Muscidae
Insects described in 1838
Diptera of North America
Diptera of Europe
Diptera of Asia
Taxa named by Alexander Henry Haliday